The Very Excellent Mr. Dundee  is a 2020 Australian comedy film directed by Dean Murphy, written by Robert Mond and Dean Murphy, and starring Paul Hogan, Rachael Carpani, Jacob Elordi, Charlotte Stent, Nate Torrence, Chevy Chase, John Cleese, Olivia Newton-John, Reginald VelJohnson, Shane Jacobson, Wayne Knight and Kerry Armstrong.

It was released on Amazon Prime Video on 17 July 2020, and was the final film Olivia Newton-John starred in before her death in 2022.

Premise
Paul Hogan is reluctantly thrust back into the spotlight as he desperately attempts to restore his sullied reputation on the eve of being knighted.

Cast
 Paul Hogan as Paul
 Jacob Elordi as Chase, Paul's son
 Chevy Chase as Chevy
 John Cleese as John
 Olivia Newton-John as Olivia
 Reginald VelJohnson as Reggie
 Wayne Knight as Wayne
 Rachael Carpani as Angie
 Nate Torrence as Luke
 Paul Fenech as Paul's Mexican Landscaper
 Shane Jacobson as Neville Dundee 
 Kerry Armstrong as Ella, Paul's date
 Charlotte Stent as Lucy
 Graham Tate as Graham 
 Mark Ellis as Mark

Production
Filming took place in Melbourne, Victoria, Australia and Los Angeles, California, USA in 2018.

Release
The film was originally scheduled to be released in Australian cinemas on 30 April 2020, but had its theatrical release cancelled due to the COVID-19 pandemic.

The Very Excellent Mr. Dundee was released exclusively on Amazon Prime Video on 17 July the same year.

Reception 
This new film has been summarized by Penelope DeBelle in Adelaide Now as "the latest in a long line of old man movies... Crocodile Dundee was 34 years ago, followed two years later by Crocodile Dundee II. Not even surgical uplifts and impeccable veneers can alter the fact that Hogan is now 80 years old. ...the idea of Hogan trying to revive the warmth and affection we had for his younger self seems a forlorn hope, just as casting a creaky Harrison Ford as a man living off the land seems an unnecessary stretch".

The film has mostly negative reviews, with one and two-star reviews from ArtsHub, Screenspace, The Sydney Morning Herald and The Guardian. The Australian newspaper's Stephen Romei gave it one star: "The kindest comment I can make about Paul Hogan's new movie, The Very Excellent Mr Dundee, is that it includes John Cleese's worst performance ever (and, yes, I have seen Fierce Creatures from 1997)".

On Metacritic, the film has a weighted average score of 24 out of 100, based on 4 critics.

Accolades

References

External links
 

2020 films
Australian comedy-drama films
2020s English-language films
Films about old age
Films not released in theaters due to the COVID-19 pandemic
Films set in Australia
Films set in Los Angeles
Films set in the 21st century
Films shot in Los Angeles
Films shot in Melbourne